Deborah Corrigan is an English glamour model.

Career
Corrigan began her career as a Page 3 girl. She was also well known for having a relationship with comedian Jim Davidson. She has had breast alteration surgery (firstly for larger breasts and then to have them reduced) and surgery on her lips (lip implants).

Filmography
The Curse of Page 3 (TV) Documentary 2003
Playboy: Stripsearch UK, Naughty Housewives 1998
Office Girls and Riding Mistresses 1998
Page 3 Video: Cyber Sex 1996
Mandy's Vibrating Toes/Cindy's Jelly Feet 1995

References

External links

1970 births
English female adult models
Living people
Page 3 girls
People from Macclesfield